Sean Connor (born 12 July 1967) is a Northern Irish football manager and former player who was most recently manager of NIFL Championship side Institute.

He had a brief playing career which included spells at Distillery, Port Vale, Macclesfield Town, Ards, and Cliftonville. He spent some years as a coach in the United States and England, before he was appointed as manager of Sligo Rovers in September 2004. He led the club to the League of Ireland First Division title in 2005. He took charge at Bohemians in November 2006, before losing his job in December 2007. He was appointed Dundalk manager in December 2008, and then joined Galway United as manager in December 2010. He then had brief and highly unsuccessful spells coaching in Africa with Zimbabwean side CAPS United in 2012 and South African club Black Leopards in 2014. He returned to management in Northern Ireland with Institute in September 2019, where he would remain for two years.

Playing career
Connor began his career at Distillery in the Irish League, playing for the club in the 1987–88 season before he joined English Third Division club Port Vale. He never made an appearance for the "Valiants" in the English Football League and went out on loan to Macclesfield Town of the Conference before he returned to Northern Ireland to play for Ards. He was involved in a car accident soon after signing for Ards, breaking his chest bone, some ribs, puncturing his lung and damaging his left leg. He made a return to football with Cliftonville but retired shortly afterwards.

Managerial career

Early career
After spending some time as press officer for Birmingham City, Connor moved to America where he coached in the USL First Division under John McGinlay for Cincinnati Riverhawks, Boston Bulldogs and in the Eastern Indoor Soccer League with the Lafayette SwampCats. He also spent time coaching non-league clubs in England and scouting for Stoke City and Lincoln City.

League of Ireland
Connor was appointed Sligo Rovers manager in September 2004 upon the recommendation of Steve Bruce. He led the club to the League of Ireland First Division title in 2005 as Rovers finished two points clear of second-place Dublin City. He then took the club to a fifth place in the League of Ireland Premier Division in 2006 and the semi-finals of the FAI Cup, where they lost to Derry City after a replay. During his time at The Showgrounds he signed Séamus Coleman. Connor tendered his resignation in November 2006 after stating that he felt he was "never fully accepted" at the club and life there was like "living in a goldfish bowl".

He was appointed as manager of Bohemians in November 2006. He led the "Bohs" to third-place in 2007, earning them a place in the UEFA Intertoto Cup. He also took the club to the semi-finals of the FAI Cup, where they were beaten by Cork City at Dalymount Park. However he was sacked by the club after he allegedly made "advances of a sexual nature" to a female volunteer; Connor denied the claim.

In December 2008, he was appointed as the manager of newly promoted Premier Division side Dundalk, who were transitioning from amateur status to become professional. He was voted Premier Division Manager of the Month for July 2009, and led the club to a fifth-place finish in the 2009 season, earning them a place in the following season's UEFA Europa League qualification rounds. He resigned in November 2009.

In January 2010, he signed a three-year contract to manage Galway United. He led the "Tribesmen" to an eighth-place finish in the 2010 season, and a relegation play-off win over Bray Wanderers at Terryland Park secured the club a place in the top-flight for the following year. His contract was "terminated by mutual agreement" in September 2011 after the club suffered their 23rd consecutive league defeat.

Africa
In January 2012, Connor was appointed as manager of Zimbabwe Premier Soccer League side CAPS United. His contract was terminated in August 2012 following a poor run of results. He fled Zimbabwe after claiming that he had received death threats from the club's staff and fans, that the club still owed him $90,000, and that the players deliberately underperformed to get him the sack. He spent some time in exile in South Africa without any finances as the legal battle with CAPS United continued.

He signed a three-year contract to manage South African National First Division side Black Leopards in July 2014, and was instructed to guide the club into the Premier Soccer League. He was fired after just six weeks having picked up just two points from his first three games. He joined the coaching staff at the Maiden City Soccer Academy in County Londonderry in March 2015.

Institute
On 14 September 2019, he returned to senior management when he was appointed as first-team manager at NIFL Premiership club Institute. The "Sky Blues" were relegated after finishing bottom of the Premiership when the 2019–20 season was curtailed due to the COVID-19 pandemic in Northern Ireland; Connor said the decision to relegate the club without the full fixture list completed was "a very, very sad day for football". The 2020–21 campaign did not take place due to the pandemic. He was sacked on 17 August 2021, "following deep and personal discussions" after a poor start to the 2021–22 season which saw Institute lose their opening three NIFL Championship games.

Honours
Individual
League of Ireland Premier Division Manager of the Month: July 2009

Sligo Rovers
League of Ireland First Division: 2005

References

1967 births
Living people
Association footballers from Belfast
Association footballers from Northern Ireland
People educated at St. Mary's Christian Brothers' Grammar School, Belfast
Lisburn Distillery F.C. players
Expatriate association footballers from Northern Ireland
Port Vale F.C. players
Macclesfield Town F.C. players
Ards F.C. players
Cliftonville F.C. players
League of Ireland players
National League (English football) players
Football managers from Northern Ireland
Expatriate football managers from Northern Ireland
Sligo Rovers F.C. managers
Bohemian F.C. managers
Dundalk F.C. managers
Galway United F.C. managers
Expatriate football managers in Zimbabwe
CAPS United F.C. managers
Expatriate soccer managers in South Africa
Black Leopards F.C. managers
Institute F.C. managers
Eastern Indoor Soccer League coaches
League of Ireland managers
Association football coaches
Association football scouts
Birmingham City F.C. non-playing staff
Stoke City F.C. non-playing staff
Lincoln City F.C. non-playing staff
Wigan Athletic F.C. non-playing staff
Association footballers not categorized by position